The 1983 Embassy World Darts Championship was staged at Jollees Cabaret Club in Stoke-on-Trent from 1–8 January 1983.

The tournament saw one of the World Darts Championship's biggest upsets, when Keith Deller defeated Eric Bristow, by 6 sets to 5 in the final, to become the youngest ever World Darts Champion and the first qualifier to win the World Championship.

Deller also beat world number 3, John Lowe in the quarter-finals and defending champion and world number 2, Jocky Wilson in the semi-finals, making him the only player in history to defeat the world's top three ranked players in the World Championship.

The final featured one of darts' most memorable moments, when Bristow was left on 121. Having hit single 17 and then treble 18, Bristow decided against hitting the bullseye. Instead he hit a single 18 to leave double 16, whilst Deller was on 138. Deller had already missed seven darts at a double to win the title in the ninth set, when leading 5-3 and Bristow believed his opponent would not check out the high finish. However, Deller hit treble 20, followed by treble 18 and finally finished on double 12 to win the title. To this day commentators often refer to 138 as the "Deller checkout" if a player is left with that score.

Seeds
  Eric Bristow
  John Lowe
  Jocky Wilson
  Stefan Lord
  Bobby George
  Cliff Lazarenko
  Nicky Virachkul
  Dave Whitcombe

Prize money
The prize fund was £32,300.

Champion: £8,000
Runner-Up: £3,500
3rd Place: £500
Semi-Finalists (2): £1,750
Quarter-Finalists (4): £1,200
Last 16 (8): £700
Last 32 (16): £400

There was also a 9-Dart Checkout prize of £30,000, along with a High Checkout prize of £750. In the semi final, Jocky Wilson missed double 18 for the 9-dart finish.

The results

Preliminary round
A best of three sets preliminary round match took place between Alan Evans of Wales and Brent Bartholomew of New Zealand as they were tied on the rankings.

Last 32

Third-place match
  Jocky Wilson 90.30 (3) 2–0 Tony Brown  79.95

References

BDO World Darts Championships
BDO World Darts 1983
Bdo World Darts Championship, 1983
Bdo World Darts Championship, 1982